Pink Elephants is a 1937 black-and-white cartoon made by the Terrytoons studio and released by 20th Century Fox. Directed by George Gordon, produced by Paul Terry and with original music by Philip A. Scheib, it was released in the United States on 9 July 1937. It is among the few unsyndicated Terrytoons that has been digitized by collectors and archivists.

Premise
After getting drunk, a goat sees three pink elephants everywhere he goes.

See also
Terrytoons

References

External links
"Pink Elephants" at the ASIFA-Hollywood Animation Archive's webpage

Terrytoons shorts
1937 films
1937 animated films
20th Century Fox short films
Animated films about animals
Animated films about elephants
Films directed by George Gordon
American animated short films
1930s American films